Ellopion of Peparethus (fl. 4th century BCE) was a Socratic philosopher, who is mentioned only by Plutarch. He accompanied Plato and Simmias in philosophical discussions with Chonuphis of Memphis.

Notes

4th-century BC philosophers
Classical Greek philosophers